The Remedy is the seventh studio album by American R&B group Jagged Edge. It was released on June 21, 2011. The new project boasts a mix of the old and new; Jagged Edge’s sexy R&B sound and contemporary beats by producers such as Casey Boyz (Brandon & Brian Casey), Cool & Dre, Cainon Lamb, Mad Skrews, Adam Ledgister, Bigg D and Jim Jonsin. The album debuted at number 35 on the Billboard 200 with 12,400 copies sold in the first week.

Background 
According to group member Kyle Norman, the album is an attempt at "a new creation, a new birth" and will be the group's follow-up release to their 2007 album, Baby Makin' Project, and their first album on Slip-N-Slide Records and their own Five 81 Records. The group hoped to work with Rick Ross, Plies, Jay-Z, Snoop Dogg, as well as newcomers Jarvis and Chelsea, who are signed to the group's Five 81 Records. Ross is the only one to make a feature on the album.

Singles 
The first official single is, "Lay You Down" which was released on July 6, 2010 on iTunes. The second official single is, "Baby" which was released on March 1, 2011. The third official single is, "Flow Through My Veins" which was released on June 9, 2011. The fourth and final single is, "Love On You" which was released on September 21, 2011.

Track listing

Charts

References 

2011 albums
Jagged Edge (American group) albums
Albums produced by Cool & Dre
Albums produced by Jim Jonsin